Carmans Notch is a wind gap located west of Mount Warren in the Catskills of New York, south of South Kortright.

References

Mountain passes of New York (state)
Climbing areas of the United States
Catskills
Landforms of Delaware County, New York
Wind gaps of New York (state)